Melchior Sun Dezhen, C.M. or Melchior Sun Souen (Chinese: 孫德禎) (1869–1951) was a Roman Catholic prelate who served as Vicar Apostolic of Anguo (1929–1936), Titular Bishop of Esbus (1926–1929), and Prefect of Lihsien (1924–1926).

Biography
Melchior Sun Dezhen was born in Beijing, China on 19 Nov 1869 and ordained a priest in the Congregation of the Mission on 24 Jan 1897.
On 15 Apr 1924, he was appointed during the papacy of Pope Pius XI as the first Prefect of Lihsien  and installed on 17 Jul 1924.
On 24 Jun 1926, he was appointed during the papacy of Pope Pius XI as Titular Bishop of Esbus and on 28 Oct 1926, he was consecrated bishop by Pope Pius XI, with Carlo Cremonesi, Titular Archbishop of Nicomedia, and Celso Benigno Luigi Costantini, Titular Archbishop of Theodosiopolis in Arcadia, serving as co-consecrators.
On 15 Jul 1929, he was elevated during the papacy of Pope Pius XI as Vicar Apostolic of Anguo after the Prefecture was promoted to an Apostolic Vicariate.
He served as Vicar Apostolic of Anguo until his resignation on 7 Feb 1936.
He died on 23 Aug 1951.

Episcopal succession
While bishop, he was the principal consecrator of:
John Baptist Wang Zeng-yi (John Baptist Wang Tseng-yi) (Uamzemi), Titular Bishop of Lamia and Vicar Apostolic of Anguo (1938);
and the principal co-consecrator of:
Peter Cheng You-you (Pierre Tcheng), Titular Bishop of Sozusa in Palaestina and Vicar Apostolic of Süanhwafu (1928);
John Zhang Bi-de (John Chang Pi-te), Titular Bishop of Antipyrgos and Vicar Apostolic of Chaohsien (1932); and
Peter Wang Mu-duo (Peter Wang Mu-To), Bishop of Xuanhua (1948).

References

External links and additional sources
 (for Chronology of Bishops) 

19th-century Roman Catholic bishops in China
Bishops appointed by Pope Pius XI
1869 births
1951 deaths
Vincentian bishops